St. John's International Airport  is in Newfoundland and Labrador, Canada. The airport is part of the National Airports System, and is operated by St. John's International Airport Authority Inc.

Designated as an international airport by Transport Canada it is classified as an airport of entry by Nav Canada and is staffed by the Canada Border Services Agency (CBSA). CBSA officers at this airport can handle aircraft with no more than 165 passengers. However, they can handle up to 450 if the aircraft is unloaded in stages.

History

World War II
Concern was expressed in the Canadian Parliament as early as September 1939 for the security of the Dominion of Newfoundland (which was not yet a part of Canada) in the event of a German raid or attack. It was felt that a permanent airfield defense facility was needed and as a result discussions were carried out among Canada, Newfoundland and the United Kingdom during 1940. In late 1940 the Canadian Government agreed to construct an air base near St. John's. Early in 1941, Canadian Prime Minister William Lyon Mackenzie King informed Newfoundland Governor Sir Humphrey T. Walwyn of the intended location in Torbay. Newfoundland agreed, but stipulated that Canada was to assume all expenses and that the aerodrome not be used for civil purposes without first receiving Newfoundland's permission. The Canadian Government agreed, and in April 1941 McNamara Construction Company began construction on the runway. At a cost of approximately $1.5 million, a pair of runways, taxiways, aprons, hangars and other facilities were built and in operation by the end of 1941. The Royal Canadian Air Force (RCAF) officially opened Torbay Airport on December 15, 1941. It was jointly used by the RCAF, Royal Air Force (RAF), and the United States Army Air Corps until December 1946.

On October 18, 1941, three American B-17 Flying Fortress and one RCAF Digby made the first unofficial landings on the only serviceable runway available. Later that month a British Overseas Airways Corporation B-24 Liberator en route from Prestwick, Scotland, to Gander, made the first sanctioned landing during a weather emergency. The first commercial air service at the facility went into operation on May 1, 1942, with the arrival at Torbay of a Trans-Canada Air Lines Lockheed Lodestar aircraft with five passengers and three crew. The first terminal building at the site was constructed in 1943. The small wooden structure was replaced by a larger brick building in 1958.

Aerodrome
The field was listed as "all hard surfaced" and had three runways listed as follows:

107 Rescue Unit RCAF

In 1954 a rescue unit was established, 107 Rescue Unit, by the RCAF to replace the existing detachment of the 103 Rescue Unit. It would remain here until 1964.

107 Rescue Unit hosted a few different aircraft to perform search and rescue operations:

 Canso-A (1)
 Noorduyn Norseman (1)
 Avro Lancaster (2) - replaced by North Star in 1963
 Canadair North Star (2) - replaced Lancasters in 1963

Post war
Although the airfield was not used as much as Argentia, Gander, Stephenville and Goose Bay airports in the movement of large numbers of aircraft to England, it was still quite busy. The Royal Air Force had its own squadron of fighters, surveillance and weather aircraft stationed there. The RCAF personnel strength on the station during the peak war years was well over 2000. Through an agreement between the US, Canadian and Newfoundland governments early in 1947, the United States Air Force (USAF) took over the use of the airport facilities and used about ten of the airport buildings. The US Military Air Transport Service (MATS) needed Torbay Airport in order to complete its assigned mission at that time. Maintenance of the airport and facilities was done by the Canadian Department of Transport.

On April 1, 1946, the airport became a civilian operation under the jurisdiction of the Canadian Department of Transport. Confusion was caused by the presence of American military personnel at a civilian airport operated by the Canadian government in a foreign country. Consequently, on 1 April 1953 control was returned to the Department of National Defence. On April 15, 1953, the RCAF Station at Torbay was reactivated and RCAF personnel started to move in and to provide the necessary administration and operation of the facility to support the mission of its co-tenant, the USAF. In early 1954 a rental agreement was signed between the USAF and the RCAF, and the USAF acquired use of additional buildings.

The control tower constructed during the war burned down in an extensive fire on March 16, 1946, which caused $1.5 million worth of damage. Construction was not begun on a new tower until 1951; it was opened in June 1952. A new Tower/Communications Building replaced that structure in March 1976. The tower was equipped with radio navigation and landing aids including precision approach radar, non-directional beacon and VHF omni-directional range.

The Transport Department maintained control over the terminal building. The facility remained RCAF Station Torbay until April 1, 1964, when it was returned to the jurisdiction of the Transport Department under the name St. John's Airport.

St. John's Airport is still commonly referred to as "Torbay" within the aviation community. For example, in aeronautical radio communications, air traffic controllers, flight dispatchers and pilots refer to the weather in "Torbay" and in flight clearances controllers commonly clear aircraft to or over St. John's with the phrase "Cleared direct Torbay". In the latter case this is a clearance to the VOR (VHF beacon) serving the region, which continues to be named Torbay on all official aeronautical charts. In addition to tradition, this usage avoids confusion with Saint John, New Brunswick, also in Atlantic Canada. Additionally the "T" in airport codes CYYT and YYT continues to reflect the Torbay origin.

Terminal and renovations
In 1981 the terminal building housed the offices of the airport manager and staff. There were ticket offices for Eastern Provincial Airways, Air Canada, Gander Aviation and Labrador Airways, a large waiting area, a secure departure lounge, a self-serve restaurant, a licensed lounge, a number of food concessions and car rental facilities. In 1981 a small museum was prepared to house the story of aviation in Newfoundland and related memorabilia.

The airport underwent a $50 million renovation in 2002. The air terminal was completely renovated, expanded and modernized to meet the standards of other airport terminals its size across North America. The airport has undergone more renovations in 2016. In 2019, the airport plans to prepare  of land to build an industrial park adjacent to the airport.

The airport was designated as one of five Canadian airports suitable as an emergency landing site for the Space Shuttle orbiter.

From the 1940s to 2006, St. John's maintained nonstop, year-round flights to Europe. Attributing its decision to the route's poor economic performance, Air Canada terminated a link to London-Heathrow that year. After receiving complaints from St. John's residents, the company stated it would convert the flight to a seasonal operation beginning in 2007. Meanwhile, British carrier Astraeus Airlines introduced service to London's Gatwick Airport in May 2007, initially intending to ply the route year-round. The airline ended the flight only three months later, however; St. John's airport officials observed that passengers had primarily opted to travel with Air Canada to the British capital. In September 2007, Air Canada also withdrew its London route, leaving St. John's without any flights to Europe.

Air Canada resumed flights to London-Heathrow on a seasonal basis in 2010, and it made the service year-round in 2014. That year, the St. John's airport acquired another transatlantic destination when WestJet commenced a summer route to Dublin, Ireland. WestJet added a seasonal connection to London's Gatwick Airport in 2016. However, the airline had ceased flights to both cities by 2018.

Airlines and destinations

Passenger

Helicopter services

Fixed-base operators based at St. John's International Airport are Provincial Airlines and Cougar Helicopters.

Statistics

Annual traffic

Fire and rescue
St. John's International Airport Emergency Services is responsible for fire and rescue needs at the airport. Apparatus and crew are housed in a single fire station is located within the Combined Services Building.

Accidents and incidents

Of the eighteen on board, only one survived.

See also

St. John's (Paddys Pond) Water Aerodrome

References

External links
St. John's International Airport Authority

Saint John's
Transport in St. John's, Newfoundland and Labrador
1941 establishments in Newfoundland
Airports established in 1941
National Airports System